Morten Christiansenl (born 16 May 1974) is a Norwegian former professional racing cyclist. He won the Norwegian National Road Race Championship in 2005.

References

External links

1974 births
Living people
Norwegian male cyclists
Place of birth missing (living people)